R Varthur Prakash (b 1966) is an Indian politician from the state of Karnataka. He is a leader of NammaCongress Party. He was elected twice as an MLA from Kolar assembly constituency.

Political career 
He contested as an independent from Kolar constituency in 2008,2013 and won each time. He worked as Textile minister in D. V. Sadananda Gowda ministry. Also he was minister in Jagadish Shetter Cabinet. But he lost K Sreenivasa Gowda of JDS Party in 2018 AC general elections when he came third. He is the founder of Namma Congress Party. He started New party on 19 December 2017 at Kudala Sangama, Bagalkot district.

His wife Shyamala Prakash (b 1981/82) died of suspected dengue in July 2017.

References

People from Karnataka
Living people
Indian politicians
Independent politicians in India
1966 births